Giorgio Conrotto (born 15 April 1987) is an Italian footballer.  He currently plays for Caratese.

Club career
He also briefly played for F.C. Internazionale Milano Primavera in the second half of 2006-07 season.

On 17 July 2014 Conrotto was signed by Serie D club Cuneo.

References

External links
 

1987 births
Living people
Italian footballers
F.C.D. Lottogiaveno players
A.S. Pizzighettone players
F.C. Canavese players
Association football defenders